Dr. Howard E. Wasdin, D.C.' (born Howard E. Wilbanks on November 8, 1961) is a former member of the United States Navy who served as a sailor in the Atlantic Fleet as well as a Navy SEAL. Following his honorable discharge, he co-wrote the autobiographical memoir SEAL Team Six: Memoirs of an Elite Navy SEAL Sniper, and its young adult version, I Am a SEAL Team Six Warrior: Memoirs of an American Soldier. Dr. Wasdin served in operation Desert Storm and was part of the operation to capture  Mohamed Farrah Aidid, a Somali warlord. It was in the operation that Dr. Wasdin was shot three times and almost lost his right leg. After 12 years of service, he earned his Doctor of Chiropractic (D.C.) from Life University in Georgia and now lives in Georgia where he operates a chiropractic clinic.

Early life and military career
Wasdin was raised in Screven, Georgia and enrolled at Cumberland College for several years. After childhood, he enlisted in the Navy in 1983.

Eventually joined the fleet, serving in Helicopter Anti-Submarine Squadron 7 (HS-7) as an antisubmarine warfare operator and rescue swimmer.  HS-7 deployed aboard  .  In early October 1986 during a deployment aboard John F. Kennedy, Wasdin was aboard a Sikorsky SH-3 Sea King helicopter that crashed in the Atlantic Ocean due to a catastrophic loss of transmission oil while tracking the Soviet submarine K-219 which had suffered an explosion and fire in a ballistic missile tube near Bermuda. Wasdin and crew were successfully rescued from the downed aircraft which eventually inverted and sank after a salvage attempt.  The remainder of his time in HS-7 revealed him to be an extremely confident and capable junior petty officer.  He was well liked among his peers.  Mr. Wasdin served the rest of his active duty contract with HS-7 Squadron before re-enlisting to attend Basic Underwater Demolition/SEAL training, graduating with BUD/S Class 143 in July 1987. Wasdin attended Basic Airborne School at Fort Benning, Georgia. Following SEAL Tactical Training (STT) and completion of six month probationary period, he received the Navy Enlisted Classification (NEC) 5326 as a Combatant Swimmer (SEAL), entitled to wear the Special Warfare insignia. Wasdin served with SEAL Team TWO in Little Creek, Virginia and completed deployments to Europe and Middle East during Persian Gulf War.  Later he volunteered to join the United States Naval Special Warfare Development Group in November 1991 and completed an eight-month specialized selection and training course. Wasdin later completed the elite USMC Scout Sniper Course at Marine Corps Base Quantico, Virginia. In August 1993, Wasdin deployed with Task Force Ranger in Mogadishu, Somalia during Operation GOTHIC SERPENT and was wounded during Battle of Mogadishu. For his heroic actions on 3 and 4 October 1993 he was awarded the Silver Star and Purple Heart. Wasdin completed his active duty service in 1995.

Awards and decorations

Author
He is the author of SEAL Team Six: Memoirs of an Elite Navy SEAL Sniper, an autobiographical memoir he co-wrote with Stephen Templin. The book details some of the extreme training that United States Navy SEALs go through, as well as his experiences in the Navy.  The book also covers aspects of his personal life, including his marriages, his childhood, and life after leaving the Navy.

The book has been adapted into a young adult version, I Am a SEAL Team Six Warrior, released in April 2012.

Critical Reception
The book was a New York Times bestseller and received positive reviews. Michiko Kakutani in The New York Times wrote, "Mr. Wasdin’s narrative is visceral and as action packed as a Tom Clancy thriller."

SEAL Team Six was released May 10, 2011, only a week after DEVGRU took part in the operation that killed Osama Bin Laden. This resulted in a great deal of publicity for both Dr. Wasdin and his book which was amended to include a Preface in which Dr. Wasdin speculates how the operation might have gone.

See also
 Chris Kyle, former Navy SEAL and author of American Sniper: The Autobiography of The Most Lethal Sniper in U.S. Military History

References

External links
http://us.macmillan.com/author/howardewasdin
http://authors.simonandschuster.com/Howard-E-Wasdin/402030124
http://howardwasdin.com

1961 births
Living people
People from Boynton Beach, Florida
People from Wayne County, Georgia
United States Navy SEALs personnel
United States Navy sailors
United States Navy personnel of the Gulf War
Battle of Mogadishu (1993)
American military writers
American autobiographers